Italo Tentorini (born 11 September 1950) is a former Italian male long-distance runner who competed at one edition of the IAAF World Cross Country Championships at senior level (1976), He won one national championships at senior level.

References

External links
 

1950 births
Living people
Italian male long-distance runners
Italian male cross country runners